Brazilian Slaughter 2006 is a live concert video album by Toxic Holocaust, released in 2008 under Mutilation Records and Unsilent Records, recorded in Brazil.

Track listing

Personnel 
Joel Grind – vocals, guitar
Whipstriker – bass
Hugo Golon – drums

References 

Toxic Holocaust albums
Live video albums
2008 video albums